David Trivunic (born 30 October 2001) is a German footballer who plays as a midfielder for FC Nöttingen.

Career
Having previously played youth football for FC Winnenden, FSV Waiblingen and Stuttgarter Kickers, Trivunic joined Karlsruher SC's academy in 2016 and signed a two-year professional contract in summer 2020. He made his debut for the club as a late substitute in a 2–1 2. Bundesliga win over 1. FC Heidenheim on 23 May 2021. On 20 June 2021, he switched to Oberliga side FC Nöttingen.

References

External links

2001 births
Living people
German footballers
People from Waiblingen
Sportspeople from Stuttgart (region)
Footballers from Baden-Württemberg
Association football midfielders
Karlsruher SC players
FC Nöttingen players
2. Bundesliga players